Tit Mellil is a town and municipality in Médiouna Province of the Casablanca-Settat region of Morocco. It is also a southeastern suburb of the city of Casablanca. It lies along National Route 9,  by road, southeast of downtown Casablanca. At the time of the 2004 census, the commune had a total population of 11710 people living in 2340 households.

References

Populated places in Médiouna Province
Municipalities of Morocco